St Patrick's Basilica is a church in Waimate in New Zealand's Canterbury Region, known because of its style of architecture. 

The church was built in 1908–1909, with the tower added in 1912. It is an Italianate-Romanesque style with an arcaded portico and the tower is impressively louvred.

The Basilica was built in brick and Oamaru stone to a design by Francis William Petre and has been described as his most original work. Three bells in the tower were cast in Belgium, with the largest bell weighing 3/4 of ton and the other two weighing 1/2 ton each. The tower at the top was built in 1912 and is 45ft high.

Inside the church, there is fine Hobday pipe organ, a marble altar and a notable sanctuary window.

The Basilica is listed by Heritage New Zealand as a Historic Place, Category 1.

See also
Roman Catholic Diocese of Christchurch

References

1909 establishments in New Zealand
Francis Petre church buildings
Heritage New Zealand Category 1 historic places in Canterbury, New Zealand
Religious buildings and structures in Canterbury, New Zealand
20th-century Roman Catholic church buildings in New Zealand
Roman Catholic churches completed in 1909
1909 in New Zealand
Basilica churches in New Zealand
Palladian Revival architecture
Listed churches in New Zealand
Waimate
1900s architecture in New Zealand
Romanesque architecture in New Zealand